Mimmi Bæivi (born 10 June 1950 in Sørøysund) is a Norwegian politician for the Labour Party.

She was elected to the Norwegian Parliament from Akershus in 1993, and was re-elected on one occasion.

Bæivi was a member of Sørøysund municipality council in the period 1979–1983, and later served as deputy mayor in 1986 and mayor in 1987–1991. She then became deputy mayor in Hammerfest from 1991–1995.

References

1950 births
Living people
Labour Party (Norway) politicians
People from Hammerfest
Mayors of Hammerfest
Members of the Storting
Women members of the Storting
21st-century Norwegian politicians
21st-century Norwegian women politicians
20th-century Norwegian politicians
20th-century Norwegian women politicians